, published in 1994, is the first of two arcade games created by Capcom based on the Dungeons & Dragons tabletop role-playing game and set in the Mystara campaign setting. It is a side scrolling beat 'em up with some role-playing video game elements for one to four players. The game was also released on the Sega Saturn, packaged with its sequel, Dungeons & Dragons: Shadow over Mystara, under the title Dungeons & Dragons Collection, although the Saturn version limited the gameplay to only two players. In 2013, both games were re-released for modern platforms as Dungeons & Dragons: Chronicles of Mystara.

Gameplay
Tower of Doom is a side-scrolling arcade game featuring four playable characters (cleric, dwarf, elf, fighter) with classic Dungeons & Dragons monsters as opponents. Bosses include a troll that regenerates unless burned, a large black dragon, the dreaded Shadow Elf (Mystara's equivalent of the drow), a beholder, the optional superboss Flamewing (a great wyrm red dragon) and the final boss Deimos (an archlich).

At points in the game the players are presented with a choice of paths to take to continue progress. Each path goes to a different area, and it is impossible to visit every area in a single play.

The gameplay is more technical than the average on beat'em up games. In addition to the usual basic attacks and jumping it includes blocking, strong attacks, turning attacks, dashing attacks, crouching and evading. It also requires the use of careful tactics, as most enemies have the same abilities as the heroes and can out-range them, too.

Daggers, hammers, arrows and burning oils can be used as throwing weapons, and many enemies have similar weapons. Spells can be used by means of magical rings or by the two playable spellcasters (a cleric and an elf).

Characters
The Fighter is a balanced character with great range and power, and has the highest amount of health.
The Elf has a short range with her sword and packs noticeably less power than the fighter, but has seven arcane spells at her disposal: Magic Missile, Invisibility, Fireball, Lightning Bolt, Polymorph Others, Ice Storm, and Cloudkill.
The Cleric has fighting skills comparable to those of the elf. He can turn undead and use five divine spells: Hold Person, Striking, Continual Light, Sticks to Snakes, and Cure Serious Wounds. He is the most adept at using a shield, being able to block many vertical attacks that the other characters cannot.
The Dwarf has short horizontal range (but the best vertical reach), and he is the most powerful character in close combat thanks to his quick combo speed.

Plot
The Republic of Darokin in Mystara is under a terrible siege as the number of monsters and their attacks rise. A group of four adventurers step forth to rescue various areas, then are sent by the merchant lord Corwyn Linton to investigate the attacks, revealed to be masterminded by the Arch Lich Deimos. Eventually the adventurers make their way to Deimos' Tower of Doom and ultimately destroy him.

Development
At the beginning of the 1990s, Capcom acquired the license to create D&D games. As part of the deal, they ported Eye of the Beholder to the Super Nintendo Entertainment System. The Japanese branch of Capcom were having difficulty getting TSR's approval for creating a D&D game, so they turned to Capcom USA to negotiate. Capcom and license-holder TSR met in January 1992 to discuss how the game should be approached. They decided to write the game's story first, and build the game around the story. Most of the staff at Capcom USA were not familiar with D&D rules and lore, so assistant James Goddard turned to D&D enthusiast Alex Jimenez to come up with a concept and make it understandable to a Japanese audience, all the while testing the product. Some of Jimenez's inspirations for the beat em up' style came from Golden Axe, while the multiple paths were based on Thayer's Quest. There was debate between Capcom and SSI on whether to make the game Asian-themed or Western-themed, which Jimenez himself managed to resolve. Jimenez supplied concept art for the characters. One of his biggest difficulties was trying to help the Japanese developers grasp the D&D elements. Originally the game was supposed to have two buttons in the arcade controls, but two more were needed to accommodate the inventory system.

Once the initial game design was complete, Jimenez translated it into an actual Dungeons & Dragons scenario and had his gamers group in San Jose play it, with himself as gamemaster. Capcom of Japan then revised the scenario design based on the players' reactions.

Home releases

Dungeons & Dragons Collection
Dungeons & Dragons Collection is a two-disc compilation of Tower of Doom and Shadow over Mystara. It was released only in Japan on March 4, 1999, exclusively for the Sega Saturn. The ports have minor differences in gameplay, and there is a maximum of two players instead of the original four. Originally Capcom had planned to release Tower of Doom as a standalone title on Sega Saturn and Sony PlayStation, but cancelled the plan early on. It was initially announced that the collection would be released for both the Saturn and PlayStation, with the PlayStation version due for a U.S. release, but the PlayStation version was shelved in early 1998 so that Capcom could focus on other projects.

In 1999, GameSpot's James Mielke criticized the loading times: "despite its use of the 4-Meg RAM Cart, loading times are horrendous, with mid-level battles occasionally pausing to let data stream in", and summarized that "as a very basic scrolling hacker, this game is simply OK. It's not bad, especially if you have a friend to help you play, but you can hardly look at this game as anything other than average". In 2005, IGN picked the Dungeons & Dragons Collection as one of the top ten co-op games. Retro Gamer included it on their list of ten essential Saturn imports, praising its "stunning animation thanks to using the 4MB ram pack" and opining that "while this does suffer from lengthy loading times, it remains the best scrolling fighter on the system, just beating Taito's delightfully odd PuLiRuLa and Capcom's own Dynasty Warriors. [sic - The Retro Gamer team are confusing Dynasty Warriors with Dynasty Wars.]" In 2023, Time Extension included the collection on their top 25 "Best Beat 'Em Ups of All Time" list.

Dungeons & Dragons: Chronicles of Mystara

Capcom announced at PAX East 2013 that they will release Tower of Doom and Shadow over Mystara as part of the Dungeons and Dragons: Chronicles of Mystara Collection for the Wii U, PlayStation 3, Xbox 360, and Microsoft Windows in the summer of 2013.

Reception
In Japan, Game Machine listed Dungeons & Dragons: Tower of Doom on their March 1, 1994 issue as being the second most-successful table arcade unit of the month, outperforming titles like Raiden II and Fatal Fury Special. In North America, RePlay reported Tower of Doom as the most-popular arcade game at the time. Play Meter also listed Tower of Doom as the fourteenth most-popular arcade game at the time. The game received a rave review from GamePro, who commented "The action is not as fast as it could be, but it's furious, smoothly controlled, and intuitive." They also praised the game's length, complexity, and non-linear nature, and its faithful recreation of Dungeons & Dragons elements.

According to GameSpy's Allen Rausch, Dungeons & Dragons: Tower of Doom was "Equally good, though not as well remembered" as other "Final Fight-style beat-'em-ups at the arcade" like Teenage Mutant Ninja Turtles and The Simpsons. Rausch felt that combat was "fun, had more depth than you might expect from such a simple game, and came loaded with secrets to find and treasures to swipe" and that after the players beat the game's seven levels, they "found out that the game's ultimate bad guy was actually just the pawn of an even bigger bad guy who, naturally, would have to wait for the sequel to show up."

Sequel

See also
List of Capcom games

References

External links

1994 video games
Action role-playing video games
Arcade video games
Cancelled PlayStation (console) games
Capcom beat 'em ups
Cooperative video games
CP System II games
Dungeons & Dragons video games
Multiplayer and single-player video games
Mystara
Role-playing video games
Sega Saturn games
Side-scrolling beat 'em ups
Video games developed in Japan
Video games featuring female protagonists